28 Weeks Later' is a 2007  post-apocalyptic horror film directed by Juan Carlos Fresnadillo, who co-wrote it with Rowan Joffé, Enrique López Lavigne and Jesus Olmo. The sequel to the 2002 film 28 Days Later, it stars Robert Carlyle, Rose Byrne, Jeremy Renner, Harold Perrineau, Catherine McCormack, Mackintosh Muggleton, Imogen Poots, and Idris Elba. It is set after the events of the first film, depicting the efforts of NATO military forces to salvage a safe zone in London, the consequence of two young siblings breaking protocol to find a photograph of their mother, and the resulting reintroduction of the Rage Virus to the safe zone.28 Weeks Later was theatrically released in the United Kingdom on 11 May 2007, by 20th Century Fox and by Fox Atomic in the United States. The film received positive reviews from critics, who praised the direction and atmosphere. It grossed over $65 million worldwide against a $15 million budget.

Plot
During the original outbreak of the Rage Virus, Don, his wife Alice, and four more survivors hide in a barricaded cottage on the outskirts of London. They hear a terrified boy pounding at their door and Don lets him in at Alice's behest. The boy eats with them and informs them of the increasingly dire situation outside.

A few minutes later, they discover that the infected have followed the boy. The infected attack and kill most of the survivors, while Don, Alice, and the boy are chased upstairs. Don pleads with Alice to leave the boy but she refuses. He abandons them by escaping out of the window. After watching his wife being dragged out of sight by the infected, he narrowly escapes on a boat, with the pilot Jacob being pulled into the water.

After the infected begin to die of starvation, NATO forces take control of Britain. Twenty-eight weeks after the outbreak, an American force, under the command of Brigadier General Stone, brings in settlers. Among the new arrivals are Don and Alice's children, Tammy and Andy, who were out of the country during the outbreak. They are admitted to District One, a safe zone on the Isle of Dogs, where they are reunited with their father, the district caretaker. In their new flat, Don tells his kids he saw their mother die before he escaped.

That night, Andy dreams about forgetting his mother's face, so Tammy and Andy sneak out of the safe zone and return to their former home, where they collect family photographs and mementos. Andy finds Alice alive and seemingly uninfected in a semi-conscious, delirious state. The three are soon discovered by soldiers and taken back to District One. Alice is taken to a quarantine room, where she is tested and found to be an asymptomatic carrier of the Rage Virus.

Don makes an unauthorized visit to Alice in her isolation cell, begging her to forgive him. She accepts his apology and tells him she loves him, prompting him to kiss her, unaware she is an infected. Don transforms, getting flashbacks of abandoning his wife, and mauls her to death. He then goes on a murderous rampage, spreading the virus. General Stone orders the building to be quarantined and orders a Code Red alert in District One. Civilians are herded into safe rooms while the soldiers search for infected.

Scarlet, a US Army medical officer, rescues Tammy and Andy, aware that the children might hold the key to a cure because of their genetic make-up and must be protected. They hide in a safe room full of people; Don breaks into the room and starts a domino effect of rapid infection. The crowd, with half its members infected, breaks out of the safe room and into the streets. The US soldiers initially are ordered to only shoot the infected, but due to not knowing who is infected or not, they are told to shoot everyone.

One of the snipers, Sergeant Doyle, unable to continue complying with the order, abandons his post and escapes with Scarlet, Tammy, Andy, and a survivor named Sam, and head for the Greenwich foot tunnel. Having lost control, Stone orders District One to be firebombed. Despite this, large numbers of the infected escape the bombardment. The next day, Doyle's pilot friend Flynn arrives by helicopter to pick up Doyle but refuses to take anyone else, as they would be shot down. A desperate Sam attempts to leap onto the helicopter but falls, as Flynn is abandoning the four.

Flynn contacts Doyle by radio and tells him to leave the civilians and head to Wembley Stadium. Doyle ignores his instructions and escorts Andy, Tammy, and Scarlet to Wembley. They break into an abandoned Volvo V70 to escape nerve gas released to kill the infected but are unable to start the car while soldiers with flamethrowers draw near. Doyle exits the car and sacrifices himself by push-starting the car and is burned alive by the soldiers. Scarlet and the kids escape into the darkness of London Underground, where the trio continues on foot. In the process, Don ambushes and kills Scarlet, then bites Andy.

Tammy arrives and Don, getting another flashback to his wife's face when he abandoned her, charges at Tammy and gets shot to death. Andy, who is still alive, gets up and runs away thinking he will become infected. After Tammy chases him down, she realizes that he is an asymptomatic carrier. They continue to the stadium and are picked up by a reluctant Flynn, who flies them across the English Channel to France. Twenty-eight days later, a French-accented voice requesting help is heard from the radio in Flynn's abandoned helicopter. A group of the infected run through a tunnel and emerge at the Paris Métro Trocadéro Station with a view across the Seine to the nearby Eiffel Tower, indicating that the virus has spread to continental Europe.

Cast

Production
Development and writing
The international success of the 2002 horror film 28 Days Later influenced its creators—director Danny Boyle, producer Andrew Macdonald and screenwriter Alex Garland—to make a sequel four years following its release. Macdonald stated, "We were quite taken aback by the phenomenal success of the first film, particularly in America. We saw an opportunity to make a second film that already had a built in audience. We thought it would be a great idea to try and satisfy that audience again."

In March 2005, however, Boyle revealed he would not be directing due to commitments to Sunshine (2007), but said he would stay on as executive producer. He also teased that its plot would revolve around the aftermath of the first film, and would involve the US Army "declaring the war against infection had been won, and that the reconstruction of the country could begin". Boyle later hired Spanish filmmaker Juan Carlos Fresnadillo, believing he would be able to "bring a fresh new perspective" to the film. Another reason he picked Fresnadillo was because he was a "huge fan" of his 2001 film Intacto. Before Fresnadillo took over, he was on a five-year hiatus from filmmaking, working on TV commercials.

Fresnadillo felt the plot involving a family in Rowan Joffé's original script was underdeveloped, so he decided to rewrite it with collaborators Enrique López-Lavigne and Jesús Olmo. Although both Fresnadillo and López-Lavigne were unimpressed with the initial draft, they found its concept of the family "trying to start over after the first outbreak" a redeemable aspect, deciding to retain it in the rewritten version. Rewriting took almost a year, with Garland making additional input on the script.

Casting
Boyle said in March 2005 that the sequel would feature a new cast, since previous cast members Cillian Murphy, Megan Burns, and Naomie Harris were occupied with their own projects. In September 2006, Robert Carlyle, Rose Byrne, Catherine McCormack, Harold Perrineau, Imogen Poots, Idris Elba, Mackintosh Muggleton and Jeremy Renner were announced as the cast for the sequel.

Even though their roles were small or shot from a distant, all the extras who played the infected were required to have a movement-based artistic background, including such occupations as ballet, dance, gymnastics, circus performing, and miming.

Filming
On 1 September 2006, principal photography for 28 Weeks Later began in London, with much of the filming taking place at Canary Wharf on the Isle of Dogs, the safe zone in the film's plot.

The on-location filming took place in London and 3 Mills Studios, although scenes intended to be shot at Wembley Stadium, then undergoing final stages of a major reconstruction, were filmed instead in Wales, with Cardiff's Millennium Stadium used as a replacement.

Promotion
 Graphic novel 
In July 2006, Fox Atomic Comics and publisher HarperCollins announced the publication, in early 2007, of 28 Days Later: The Aftermath, a graphic novel bridging the gap between 28 Days Later and 28 Weeks Later. Motion comics of two segments of the graphic novel were added to the DVD & Blu-ray release of 28 Weeks Later.

 Websites 
Removable chalk-powder graffiti was sprayed in locations around London and Birmingham featuring the web address www.ragevirus.com. However, the web address was found to be unregistered and was quickly snapped up. The advertising agency who made the mistake agreed to purchase the rights to the domain name for an undisclosed sum.

In April 2007, the horror/science-fiction film website Bloody Disgusting promoted 28 Weeks Later by giving readers a chance to win a prop from the film. The props were included in a "District 1 Welcome Pack", which featured an ID card and an edition of the London Evening Standard newspaper with a headline proclaiming the evacuation. The giveaway was only open to residents of North America, and entries closed on 9 May 2007.

 Biohazard warning 
On 13 April 2007, 28 days before the release of the film in UK cinemas, a huge biohazard warning sign was projected against the White Cliffs of Dover. The sign contained the international biological hazard symbol, along with the admonition that the UK was "contaminated, keep out!"

 Flash game 
In May 2007, 20th Century Fox posted a free 28 Weeks Later-themed flash game on their international website, foxinternational.com. In the game, the player can play one of the infected in three parts of the city.

Release28 Weeks Later was released on 11 May 2007, in the United Kingdom by 20th Century Fox and in the United States by Fox Atomic.

Marketing
This trailer was released on March 23, 2007, and attached to screenings in front of The Hills Have Eyes 2.

Home media
1.3 million DVD units have been sold in the United States, gathering a revenue of $24.3 million, as of July 2010. The film has been released as its own DVD and as a double feature with 28 Days Later.

Reception
Box office
The film opened in 2,000 cinemas across the United States. It made $9.8 million in its opening weekend, coming in second place at the box office, behind Spider-Man 3. The film has grossed $28.6 million in the US and $35.6 million in other countries, bringing the worldwide total to $64.2 million.

Critical reception
On review aggregator Rotten Tomatoes, the film has generated a rating of 72% based on 196 reviews and an average rating of 6.6/10. The website's critical consensus states, "While 28 Weeks Later lacks the humanism that made 28 Days Later a classic, it's made up with fantastic atmosphere and punchy direction." On Metacritic, it has a weighted average of 78/100 based on 34 critics, indicating "generally favorable reviews".View London called the film an "exciting, action-packed and superbly directed thriller that more than lives up to the original film". The New York Timess A. O. Scott remarked that it is "brutal and almost exhaustingly terrifying, as any respectable zombie movie should be. It is also bracingly smart, both in its ideas and in its techniques".

Derek Elley for Variety called it "a full-bore zombie romp that more than delivers the genre goods".

Soundtrack

The soundtrack was composed, written and performed by John Murphy. The score was released exclusively to iTunes on 12 June 2007. On 2 June 2009, a limited edition soundtrack was released by La-La Land Records. Only 1500 copies were made.

Possible sequel
Fox Atomic stated in June 2007 that they would consider producing a third film if DVD sales of the film did well. In July 2007, while promoting Sunshine, Boyle said he had a possible story for the next film: "There is an idea for the next one, something which would move the story on. I've got to think about it, whether it's right or not." In October 2010, when Alex Garland was asked what was happening with 28 Months Later, he declared: "I'll answer that completely honestly. When we made 28 Days Later, the rights were frozen between a group of people who are no longer talking to each other. And so, the film is never going to happen unless those people start talking to each other again. There is no script as far as I'm aware."

In January 2011, Danny Boyle said, "There is a good idea for it, and once I've got [my stage production of] Frankenstein open, I'll begin to think about it a bit more." On 13 April 2013, Boyle stated: "[I]t's 40/60 whether [a sequel] happens or not. But we did have an idea of where to set it and what it might be about." When asked to share that idea, Boyle laughed and said, "No, because they'll end up in The Walking Dead''."

On 14 January 2015, Garland stated:

In June 2019, Boyle confirmed that he and Garland had recently met to discuss and begin preparation on a third film.

In March 2020 and May 2021 respectively, both Imogen Poots and Cillian Murphy stated they would be interested in reprising their roles.

References

External links

 
 

2007 films
2007 horror films
2000s science fiction horror films
American action horror films
American science fiction horror films
American post-apocalyptic films
American zombie films
American sequel films
British action horror films
British science fiction horror films
British post-apocalyptic films
British zombie films
British sequel films
Spanish science fiction horror films
Spanish post-apocalyptic films
Spanish sequel films
28 Days Later
English-language Spanish films
Films about viral outbreaks
Uxoricide in fiction
Films set in London
Films set in Paris
Films shot in Cardiff
Films shot in London
Films shot in Wales
Films directed by Juan Carlos Fresnadillo
Films scored by John Murphy (composer)
20th Century Fox films
Dune Entertainment films
DNA Films films
Animal Logic films
2000s English-language films
2000s American films
2000s British films